Tayappa Hari Sonawane (10 September 1910 – 10 November 1973) was an Indian politician. He was elected to the Lok Sabha, the lower house of the Parliament of India  as a member of the Indian National Congress.

Sonawane died in Bombay on 10 November 1973, at the age of 63.

References

External links
Official biographical sketch in Parliament of India website

1910 births
1973 deaths
India MPs 1957–1962
India MPs 1962–1967
India MPs 1967–1970
Indian National Congress politicians from Maharashtra
Lok Sabha members from Maharashtra